A Six Cylinder Elopement is a 1912 American silent short romantic comedy written by Lloyd Lonergan. The film starred William Garwood, Riley Chamberlain and Marguerite Snow.

Cast
 Riley Chamberlain as Ex-Congressman Gray, The Girl's Father
 Marguerite Snow as Gray's Daughter
 William Garwood as John Henderson, Gray's Daughter's Sweetheart

External links

1910s romantic comedy films
1912 films
Thanhouser Company films
American romantic comedy films
American silent short films
American black-and-white films
1912 short films
1912 comedy films
1910s American films
Silent romantic comedy films
Silent American comedy films